Bernhard von Beskow (19 April 179617 October 1868) was a Swedish dramatist and historian.

Born in Stockholm and the son of a merchant, his vocation for literature was assisted by his tutor, the poet Johan Magnus Stjernstolpe (1777–1831), whose works he edited. He entered the civil service in 1814, was ennobled in 1826 and received the title of baron in 1843. He held high appointments at court, and was, from 1834 onward, perpetual secretary of the Swedish Academy, using his great influence with tact and generosity. He was elected a member of the Royal Swedish Academy of Sciences in 1836.

He produced a series of plays based on Swedish history.  He was the most respectable exponent of romantic historical play which became popular with Swedish audiences. His works include many academical memoirs, volumes of poems, philosophy and a historical study, Om Gustav den tredje såsom Konung och Menniska (5 vols, 1860–1869, Gustavus III as king and man), printed in the transactions of the Swedish Academy (vols 32, 34, 37, 42, 44).

According to the Encyclopædia Britannica Eleventh Edition: "His poetry is over-decorated, and his plays are grandiose historical poems in dramatic form. Among them are Erik XIV (2 parts, 1826); and four pieces collected (1836–1838) as Dramatiska Studier, the most famous of which is the tragedy of Torkel Knutsson."

He became a member of Pro Fide et Christianismo, a Christian education society, in 1852.

He died in Stockholm in 1868.

References

1796 births
1868 deaths
Writers from Stockholm
Swedish male writers
19th-century Swedish historians
Members of the Swedish Academy
Members of the Royal Swedish Academy of Sciences
Swedish nobility
Members of the Royal Swedish Academy of Arts
Swedish male dramatists and playwrights
19th-century Swedish dramatists and playwrights
19th-century male writers